The Capture of Hormuz in 1507 occurred when the Portuguese Afonso de Albuquerque attacked Hormuz Island to establish the Fortress of Hormuz. This conquest gave the Portuguese full control of the trade between India and Europe passing through the Persian Gulf.

Background

The campaign against Hormuz was a result of a plan by King Manuel I of Portugal, who in 1505 had resolved to thwart Muslim trade in the Indian Ocean by capturing Aden to block trade through the Red Sea and Alexandria; Ormuz, to block trade through Beirut; and Malacca to control trade with China. The Portuguese had reports indicating that the island of Socotra was inhabited by Nestorian Christians and might prove useful towards this endeavor. Socotra was then a dominion of the Banu Afrar clan of Qishn, in mainland Arabia, whom the Portuguese would refer in the 16th century as Fartaques.

Thus, in April 1506, two fleets totalizing 16 ships, under the overall command of Tristão da Cunha, were dispatched from Lisbon to capture Socotra and establish on it a fort. Cunha was assisted by Afonso de Albuquerque, who was nominated as captain-major of the sea of Arabia and tasked with blockading Muslim shipping in the Red Sea.

After a long journey of 12 months, 6 months longer than predicted, the fleet finally landed at Suq in Socotra in April 1507. After a brief but stiff struggle, the Portuguese took over the local fort, which was renamed São Miguel, and a tribute in goats was imposed on the population to sustain it. Tristão da Cunha then proceeded to India in July, leaving Albuquerque with seven ships on the island.

After such a long journey though, Albuquerque had lost many men to disease, his ships and equipment were in need of repairs and had almost exhausted his food supplies. Socotra proved to be much poorer and remoter than the Portuguese had anticipated, so the expedition soon ran the risk of starvation. Because of this, on August 10 Afonso de Albuquerque set sail to the Strait of Hormuz where, hopefully, he could acquire supplies by any means necessary, and accomplish his secret instructions to subjugate Hormuz - or "die like knights rather than starving little by little", in the words of Albuquerque.

Portuguese conquest of Oman
In the early 16th century, the coastal cities of Oman were a dependency of the kingdom of Hormuz, ruled by its governors.

On  August 22, 1507, the squadron of Albuquerque reached Qalhat, whose governor preferred to deliver fruits and exchange hostages with the Portuguese. Qurayyat further north however, erected stockades and attempted to resist, but the town was assaulted and sacked. Muscat was then governed by a eunuch and former slave of the king of Hormuz, who surrendered to Albuquerque, but the garrison overruled his decision, for which the town was likewise sacked.

Sohar was then the only town in Oman protected by a small fort, but it promptly capitulated at the sight of the Portuguese. The town was spared, gifts were exchanged, and in return for a pledge of vassalage, its governor was  entrusted with a Portuguese flag to hoist, and allowed keep the annual tribute for himself and his troops ahead of the fort.

Finally, Khor Fakkan also attempted to resist, but it was sacked. At Khor Fakkan, the Portuguese captured one of the three governors of the town - an elder who seemed so distinguished that he was brought before Albuquerque. Speaking courteous words, he claimed the Portuguese seemed "not inferior to the army of Alexander the Great". When questioned how he knew of Alexander, the man offered Albuquerque a crimson book written in Farsi of the life of Alexander. Most likely, this was the famous Eskandar Nameh written by Nizami Ganjavi, which Albuquerque "prized above anything else". Thus, the Portuguese conquered Oman.

First conquest of Hormuz, 1507

Late in the evening of September 26, 1507, the Portuguese fleet made their approach into the harbour of Hormuz, properly adorned with flags and salvaging the city for half an hour.

News of the Portuguese conquest of Oman had sown considerable distress within the city, and rumour had spread that the Portuguese even devoured people. Likely for this reason, Albuquerque was greeted by no emissaries, with whom he could engage in diplomatic relations. In such case, he summoned the captain of the largest vessel in the harbour – an 800 tons Gujarati trade ship – to his ship instead, to act as a conveyor of his intentions to the sovereign of Hormuz. He declared to have come with orders from King Manuel of Portugal to vassalize Hormuz and take it under his protection, but he offered the city the chance to capitulate bloodlessly.

Hormuz was then ruled not by its sovereign, the young twelve year-old king Seyf Ad-Din, but by its powerful vizier, the Bengali eunuch Cogeatar (Hwaga Ata), who proved unintimidated by the comparatively small fleet. During the night, the Portuguese could hear men being ferried onto the ships and barricades erected, revealing to them the vizier's intention to resist.

Battle

The Portuguese were surrounded by some 50 armed merchant-ships on the land side and somewhere between 120 to 200 light oarcraft on the sea side. Albuquerque made no attempts to escape this encirclement; he would instead take advantage of the excessive number of enemy vessels specifically to allow the artillery to fire for greater effect.

As negotiations broke down by about 9 a.m. of the following day, Albuquerque's flagship Cirne opened fire, and the rest of the fleet followed suit. Volleys were exchanged between the Hormuzi fleet and the Portuguese, with a clear advantage to the latter, and large clouds of smoke formed around the ships, greatly impairing visibility.

From the beaches, the inhabitants of Hormuz, the King included, observed the battle attentively; some were killed by stray cannonballs, and scattered.

The Hormuzi light-oar ships, carrying a great number of mercenary Persian bowmen, maneuvered to attack the Portuguese fleet en masse. At this point, the Portuguese experienced some difficulties due to their lack of personnel, but the compact group of shallow enemy vessels made for an ideal target for Portuguese gunners: about a dozen were sunk and many more disabled, thus obstructing the path of the ones following.

As confusion and discoordination set in amongst the Hormuzis, the Portuguese passed on the offensive: Albuquerque had his ship grapple the great carrack of Gujarat, which was boarded and rendered submissive after a stiff fight. One after the other, the Portuguese captured or burned most ships afloat. Finally, the Portuguese made a landing by the shipyards and began setting fire to the outskirts of Hormuz; fearing a bloody assault by the Portuguese, the vizier Cogeatar raised a white flag over the royal palace announcing the surrender.

With no more than 500 men and six decaying ships, Albuquerque had subdued the most powerful naval power in the Gulf.

Mutiny
After long negotiations, on October 10, Afonso de Albuquerque met with the King of Hormuz Seyf Ad-Din, the vizier Cogeatar, and his right-hand man Rais Nureddin Fali, to sign the terms of capitulation: They consisted of a tribute worth 15,000 ashrafi (a Persian coin), Portuguese exemption from paying customs dues, and the right to erect a fortress on the island, in exchange for allowing the king to keep his position under Portuguese military protection, while the merchants had the vessels captured in the battle returned to them.

Albuquerque ordered his soldiers to set about erecting the fort on the northernmost tip of the island in turns, and every night the Portuguese would reembark before landing the following morning (to avoid revealing how few the Portuguese actually were). This astonished the Hormuzis, unaccustomed as they were to seeing fighting men engage in menial work.

Hormuz was a tributary state of Persia, and in a famous episode, Albuquerque was confronted by two Persian envoys who demanded the payment of the tribute from him instead. Albuquerque had them delivered guns, swords, cannonballs, and arrows, retorting that such was the "currency" struck in Portugal to pay tribute.

Yet, the construction of the fortress under the harsh Hormuzi climate raised grave complaints and disagreements among the Portuguese, especially the Portuguese captains, who contested Albuquerque's decision of lingering on Hormuz.

Eventually, in December, four sailors deserted from the armada to Cogeatar, informing him of the real Portuguese numbers and the dissent among their ranks. Realizing the danger of the situation, Albuquerque evacuated all of his men from the incomplete fort back to the ships, and put Hormuz under blockade, hoping the lack of water sources on the island would force Cogeatar to return the renegades and Hormuz into submission. The Portuguese too, however, had to take lengthy journeys to the island of Qeshm or Larak for fresh water. Eventually, at the end of January 1508, three of Albuquerque's captains - Afonso Lopes da Costa, António do Campo, and Manuel Teles - deserted to Cochin, in India, with their respective vessels. Realizing the weakness of his position, on February 8 so too did Albuquerque depart from Hormuz.

Socotra

João da Nova returned with his vessel, the Flor do Mar to India, while Albuquerque returned to Socotra with Francisco de Távora, where he found the Portuguese garrison starving. From there, Francisco de Távora on the Rei Grande was sent to Malindi in east-Africa to fetch for more supplies, while Albuquerque remained with his Cirne in the Gulf of Aden, contacting the Somalis of the Horn and raiding merchant ships. In April, Francisco de Távora returned to Socotra in the company of Diogo de Melo and Martim Coelho and their respective vessels, whom he encountered on east-Africa on their way to India. For the garrison of Socotra, they bore the first news of Portugal in two years.

In August, Albuquerque again set sail to Hormuz to scout its situation, and on the way sacked Qalhat, for having given spoilt foodstuffs the previous year Upon seeing that Hormuz had been duly fortified, and that the Cirne was taking in a dangerous amount of water, he returned to India.

Albuquerque vowed not to cut his beard until he had conquered Hormuz.

Takeover of Hormuz, 1515

On November 4, 1509, Albuquerque succeeded Dom Francisco de Almeida as governor of Portuguese India.

Before returning to Hormuz, he would still go on to conquer Goa in 1510, Malacca in 1511, and undertake an incursion to the Red Sea in 1513. Albuquerque never stopped gathering information on Hormuz nor even exchanging ambassadors or corresponding with its viziers during this time. Indeed, important changes had taken place in Hormuz between 1507 and 1515 that motivated Albuquerque to make a move as soon as possible: Coge Atar had been murdered and the new vizier, his right-hand man Rais Nureddin Fali, had King Seyf Ad-Din poisoned, and replaced on the throne with his eighteen-year-old brother Turan Shah. Rais Nureddin in his turn however, was driven from power by his nephew Rais Ahmed through a coup and maintained power through brute force and repression, with the support of an opposing faction in court, greatly frightening young Turan Shah with the spectre of assassination or blindness.

Thus, Albuquerque assembled at Goa a fleet of 27 vessels, 1,500 Portuguese, and 700 Malabarese and in March 1515 the Portuguese once more anchored before Hormuz, at the sound of trumpets and a powerful artillery salvo; "The ships appeared to be on fire", as the eyewitness Gaspar Correia would later recount.

Hormuz was found fortified and prepared for a drawn-out struggle; nevertheless, King Turan Shah and Rais Nureddin for their part did not oppose Albuquerque, hoping that he might be an ally against the usurper Rais Ahmed (labelled by the Portuguese a "tyrant"), as indeed the Portuguese had proven to be only interested in trade and tribute and not effective control of the kingdom. Thus, on April 1, King Turan Shah allowed Albuquerque to land his forces and formally re-take possession of Hormuz without bloodshed, and so, the flag of Portugal was finally hoisted over the island.

Aftermath
Before proceeding with the affairs of Hormuz, Albuquerque offered a grand public audience to an ambassador that Shah Ismail sent to Hormuz seeking to open diplomatic talks with the Portuguese; Albuquerque considered it imperative to secure friendly relations with Persia against the Ottoman Empire.

Several weeks after, Albuquerque was informed by Turan Shah that Reis Ahmed plotted his assassination. Albuquerque requested a meeting with the king and his ministers at a palace heavily guarded by Portuguese soldiers. There, he had his captains murder Reis Ahmed in the presence of the king, thus 'freeing' Turan Shah from the yoke of the usurper; in reassuring Turan Shah of his safety as a vassal of Portugal, Albuquerque knighted the king and addressed him not as a conqueror, but as a servant:

Meanwhile, a mutinous crowd had formed around the palace, fearing the king had been assassinated; Turan Shah was then led to the palace rooftop, where he triumphantly addressed the city, that now cheered for the death of Reis Ahmed.

The fortress

With Hormuz secured, Albuquerque resumed building the fortress, employing his men and hired local labour, a work in which he participated personally. The site at the northern tip of the tear-drop shaped island of Hormuz, strategically overlooking the city and both harbours on either side, was selected for its construction. Its layout resembled an irregular pentagon with seven towers and was christened in honor of Our Lady of Conception, Fortaleza da Nossa Senhora da Conceição de Hormuz, in Portuguese. It had a garrison of 400 Portuguese soldiers. A large pillory was erected in the marketplace, and later a large courtyard opened between the fortress and the city.

In 1550, the old fortress was renovated and expanded under the guise of architect Inofre de Carvalho, who designed a larger fortress better adapted to the precepts of modern gunpowder warfare.

Portuguese Administration

At Hormuz, Albuquerque adopted the principle of indirect rule: the king was allowed to rule his kingdom as a vassal of the Portuguese Crown, but it was disarmed and the Portuguese took control of defence, leaving only a royal guard, effectively turning it into a protectorate. The yearly tribute of 15,000 ashrafi was enforced, and Albuquerque collected the tribute in arrears: 120 000 ashrafi. Throughout the 16th century, this sum would progressively be raised.

The old state of violent intrigue between the various court factions at Hormuz and the brutal repression by Rais Ahmed had dissuaded many merchants from seeking the city in recent years, causing trade to decline; such a tendency was only reversed by the Portuguese takeover. At the same time, the presence of Portuguese forces at Hormuz also made navigation much safer in the Gulf. The kings of Basra, Bahrein, Lar and neighbouring Persian governors dispatched embassies to Albuquerque, seeking friendly relations. Great crowds would form to witness Albuquerque whenever he rode through the streets, and painters were sent to Hormuz to take his portrait.

As all seagoing trade between India and the Middle-East passed through Hormuz, the total yearly revenue of Hormuz was estimated by certain Portuguese authors such as Gaspar Correia at about 140,000 cruzados, 100,000 of those from the customs alone; the Portuguese historian João de Barros reported that in 1524, the customs had yielded 200,000 cruzados. With Hormuz secured, Albuquerque captured the strategic war-horses trade, that was exported from Arabia and Persia to India via Hormuz, which he directed to Goa. Of all the Portuguese possessions in the Orient, Hormuz came to be a vital source of income for the Portuguese State of India.

In 1521 the king of Bahrein, a vassal of Hormuz rebelled against Hormuzi suzerainty, refusing to pay the due tribute; Bahrain was then conquered by António Correia with the support of Hormuzi troops, and annexed to the Kingdom of Hormuz. Henceforth it was administered by an Hormuzi governor. Later that year, the city of Hormuz itself rose in revolt against the Portuguese, but it was suppressed. In 1523, Sohar in Oman likewise rebelled, but it was pacified by Dom Luís de Menezes, while Muscat and Qalhat rebelled in 1526 but were likewise pacified.

In 1552, Ottoman vessels under the command of Piri Reis attacked the city, but he failed to capture it. Hormuz, and the Persian Gulf as a whole, would see intense competition between the Ottomans and Portuguese during the 1550s as part of the Ottoman-Portuguese conflicts (1538-1559). Portuguese and Turkish fleets would clash before Hormuz in 1553 at the Battle of the Strait of Hormuz and in 1554 at the Battle of the Gulf of Oman, the Turks being destroyed outright in the latter. In 1559, the Ottomans made a final attempt to capture Bahrain, but failed.

An account of the history of Hormuz was first published in Europe in 1569, when the Portuguese friar Gaspar da Cruz published in Évora the "Chronicle of the Kingdom of Hormuz", likely translated from original documents during his stay in the city; he included it in his Tratado das Cousas da China, the first European book with an exclusive focus on China.

Hormuz would remain a Portuguese client-state until the fall of Hormuz to a combined English-Persian force in 1622.

See also
 Kingdom of Hormuz
 Portuguese Empire
 Afonso de Albuquerque
 Anglo-Persian capture of Hormuz
 British occupation of Bushehr

Notes

References

Further reading
 

Battles involving Portugal
Hormuz Island
Conflicts in 1507
1507 in Portugal
Battles involving Safavid Iran
16th century in Iran
1507 in Asia
1507 in the Portuguese Empire